The European Nations Cup Second division 2008–2010 was the second tier of the European Championship for developing Rugby Union nations.

It was made up of two divisions with 5 teams in each division. Due to changes in the structure of the European Nations Cup for the 2010–2012 competition, no team was be relegated from Division 2A or 2B. The winner of Division 2A was promoted to Division One and the winner of Division 2B earned promotion to Division 2A.

The leader of Division 2B at the end of the 2008–2009 season, and the champion of Division 2A at the end of the competition, received the opportunity to participate in qualification for the 2011 Rugby World Cup.

The former champions of Division 2A were Germany who were replaced by the relegated Czech Republic. Poland won Division 2B and were promoted to Division 2A in place of the Netherlands.  Sweden was promoted from Division 3A to replace the relegated Andorra.

Division 2A

The tournament was won by Ukraine, that obtained the promotion to the highest lever of ENC, and qualification to Rugby World Cup Qualification.

The match between Poland and Moldova was originally scheduled for April 10, 2010, but was postponed after the death of Poland's president, Lech Kaczyński, earlier that day., Then was definitely cancelled.

Division 2B

See also
 European Nations Cup
 2008-2010 European Nations Cup First Division
 2008-2010 European Nations Cup Third Division

2008-10
2008–09 in European rugby union
2009–10 in European rugby union
European Nations Cup Second Division
Euro
European Nations Cup Second Division

de:2008/2010 European Nations Cup Division 2
it:Campionato europeo per Nazioni di rugby 2008-2010
ka:ევროპის ერთა თასის მეორე დივიზიონი 2008-2010